Rothenburgsort  is a quarter in the Hamburg-Mitte borough of the Free and Hanseatic city of Hamburg in northern Germany. In December 2020, the population was 9,043.

History

Geography
The quarter is situated in the south-east center of Hamburg. It borders with the Hamburg quarters of Billbrook, Hammerbrook, Hamm, HafenCity, Veddel, and Wilhelmsburg in the Hamburg-Mitte borough; Moorfleet, Spadenland, and Tatenberg in the Bergedorf borough.

Demographics
In 2006 the population of the Rothenburgsort quarter was 8660 with 15.8% being children under the age of 18, and 16.7% being 65 years of age or older. Resident aliens were 27.5% of the population. 552 people were registered as unemployed.

In 1999 there were 4,324 households, out of which 20.6% had children under the age of 18 living with them and 48.3% of all households were made up of individuals. The average household size was 2.05.

Notable residents
 Morsal Obeidi, murder victim

Notes

References 

 Selectable database: Statistical office Hamburg and Schleswig-Holstein Statistisches Amt für Hamburg und Schleswig-Holstein.

External links

Quarters of Hamburg
Hamburg-Mitte